Llanddaniel Fab (or Llanddaniel-fab) is a village and community in Anglesey, Wales.  At the 2001 census it had a population of 699, increasing to 776 at the 2011 census.

It is near the prehistoric monument of Bryn Celli Ddu which was constructed in the late Neolithic period.  In the east of the community, by the Menai Strait, stands the country seat of the Marquess of Anglesey, Plas Newydd, parts of which date from the 14th century.  The house has been owned by the National Trust since 1976.

In the 16th century the poet Catrin ferch Gruffudd ap Hywel lived here. Her Welsh poems are preserved and they include an Awdl with a religious theme written in 1555.

During the 2001 United Kingdom foot-and-mouth crisis, many sheep and cattle were slaughtered in the area.

The village has its own community council and its county council representative is Hywel Eifion Jones, who has held the post since May 1999. Amenities include a post office, primary school (Ysgol Parc y Bont), and a 12-hole golf course.

Probably the village's most famous son is Tecwyn Roberts (1925-1988), who  became NASA’s first Flight Dynamics Officer with Project Mercury that put the first American into space. Roberts was born at Trefnant Bach cottage in Llanddaniel Fab and was a former pupil of Ysgol Parc y Bont. After serving as a member of the Avro Arrow project team and the Space Task Group, Roberts transferred to NASA where he eventually became chief of the Manned Flight Support Division, chief of the Network Engineering Division during the Apollo Program and later Director of Networks at Goddard Space Flight Center.

The village was struck by an F1/T2 tornado on 23 November 1981, as part of the record-breaking nationwide tornado outbreak on that day.

Church

St Deiniol's Church is a small 19th-century church in the village. The first church in this location is said to have been established by St Deiniol Fab (to whom the church is dedicated) in 616.  The current building incorporates some material and fittings from its predecessor, which probably dated from about the 16th century.  The church is no longer in use, and the village is now served by a church in Llanfairpwllgwyngyll.  It is a Grade II listed building, a designation given to "buildings of special interest, which warrant every effort being made to preserve them", in particular because it is regarded as "a good example of a simple 19th-century rural church".

References

External links
 A Vision of Britain Through Time
 British Listed Buildings
 Genuki
 Geograph
 Llanddaniel
 Office for National Statistics